Sea Sorrow is a 2017 British documentary film about child refugees in the European migrant crisis, directed by Vanessa Redgrave. It was shown in the Special Screenings section at the 2017 Cannes Film Festival. On review aggregator Rotten Tomatoes, the film holds an approval rating of 67% based on 12 reviews, with an average rating of 5.4/10.

Cast
 Ralph Fiennes as Prospero
 Emma Thompson as Sylvia Pankhurst

See also
 Fire at Sea
 It Will Be Chaos
 Human Flow
 Inside Europe: Ten Years of Turmoil

References

External links
 

2017 films
2017 documentary films
2017 directorial debut films
British documentary films
Documentary films about child refugees
Works about the European migrant crisis
2010s English-language films
2010s British films